Clarques  is a former commune in the Pas-de-Calais department in the Hauts-de-France region of France. On 1 January 2016, it was merged into the new commune Saint-Augustin. Its population was 309 in 2018.

Geography
A farming village situated 8 miles (13 km) south of Saint-Omer, on the D190 and D192 road junction.

Population

Places of interest
 The church of St.Martin, dating from the seventeenth century.
 The remains of two abbeys: The Benedictine abbey of Saint-Jean-au-Mont, founded in 1080 by Hubert, Bishop of Thérouanne, was destroyed in 1537 during military operations and the community took refuge at Ypres. The other abbey was founded in 1131 as an Augustinian (Premonstratensian order) by Milon, Bishop of Thérouanne, which survived until the French Revolution.
 A watermill
 A chateau

The present chateau was built in the early 1780s by Augustin Titelouze de Gournay, a king's musketeer, before his marriage to Marie-Therese de Feuchin in 1788. The house was enlarged in 1905 by Joseph de Gournay from the plans of architect Lillois Vilain, adding the protruding wings.

See also
Communes of the Pas-de-Calais department

References

Former communes of Pas-de-Calais